Granulocyte-macrophage colony-stimulating factor (GM-CSF), also known as colony-stimulating factor 2 (CSF2), is a monomeric glycoprotein secreted by macrophages, T cells, mast cells, natural killer cells, endothelial cells and fibroblasts that functions as a cytokine. The pharmaceutical analogs of naturally occurring GM-CSF are called sargramostim and molgramostim.

Unlike granulocyte colony-stimulating factor, which specifically promotes neutrophil proliferation and maturation, GM-CSF affects more cell types, especially macrophages and eosinophils.

Function 

GM-CSF is a monomeric glycoprotein that functions as a cytokine—it is a white blood cell growth factor. GM-CSF stimulates stem cells to produce granulocytes (neutrophils, eosinophils, and basophils) and monocytes. Monocytes exit the circulation and migrate into tissue, whereupon they mature into macrophages and dendritic cells. Thus, it is part of the immune/inflammatory cascade, by which activation of a small number of macrophages can rapidly lead to an increase in their numbers, a process crucial for fighting infection.

GM-CSF also has some effects on mature cells of the immune system. These include, for example, enhancing neutrophil migration and causing an alteration of the receptors expressed on the cells surface.

GM-CSF signals via signal transducer and activator of transcription, STAT5. In macrophages, it has also been shown to signal via STAT3. The cytokine activates macrophages to inhibit fungal survival. It induces deprivation in intracellular free zinc and increases production of reactive oxygen species that culminate in fungal zinc starvation and toxicity. Thus, GM-CSF facilitates development of the immune system and promotes defense against infections.

GM-CSF also plays a role in embryonic development by functioning as an embryokine produced by reproductive tract.

Genetics 

The human gene has been localized in close proximity to the interleukin 3 gene within a T helper type 2-associated cytokine gene cluster at chromosome region 5q31, which is known to be associated with interstitial deletions in the 5q- syndrome and acute myelogenous leukemia. GM-CSF and IL-3 are separated by an insulator element and thus independently regulated. Other genes in the cluster include those encoding interleukins 4, 5, and 13.

Glycosylation 

Human granulocyte-macrophage colony-stimulating factor is glycosylated in its mature form.

History 

GM-CSF was first cloned in 1985, and soon afterwards three potential drug products were being made using recombinant DNA technology: molgramostim was made in Escherichia coli and is not glycosylated, sargramostim was made in yeast, has a leucine instead of proline at position 23 and is somewhat glycosylated, and regramostim was made in Chinese hamster ovary cells (CHO) and has more glycosylation than sargramostim.  The amount of glycosylation affects how the body interacts with the drug and how the drug interacts with the body.

At that time, Genetics Institute, Inc. was working on molgramostim, Immunex was working on sargramostim (Leukine), and Sandoz was working on regramostim.

Molgramostim was eventually co-developed and co-marketed by Novartis and Schering-Plough under the trade name Leucomax for use in helping white blood cell levels recover following chemotherapy, and in 2002 Novartis sold its rights to Schering-Plough.

Sargramostim was approved by the US FDA in 1991 to accelerate white blood cell recovery following autologous bone marrow transplantation under the trade name Leukine, and passed through several hands, ending up with Genzyme, which was subsequently acquired by Sanofi. Leukine is now owned by Partner Therapeutics (PTx).

Imlygic was approved by the US FDA in October 2015, and in December 2015 by the EMA, as an oncolytic virotherapy, commercialized by Amgen Inc. This oncolytic herpes virus, named Talimogene laherparepvec, has been genetically engineered to express human GM-CSF using the tumor cells machinery.

Clinical significance
GM-CSF is found in high levels in joints with rheumatoid arthritis and blocking GM-CSF as a biological target may reduce the inflammation or damage. Some drugs (e.g. otilimab) are being developed to block GM-CSF. In critically ill patients GM-CSF has been trialled as a therapy for the immunosuppression of critical illness, and has shown promise restoring monocyte and neutrophil function, although the impact on patient outcomes is currently unclear and awaits larger studies.

GM-CSF stimulates monocytes and macrophages to produce pro-inflammatory cytokines, including CCL17. Elevated GM-CSF has been shown to contribute to inflammation in inflammatory arthritis, osteoarthritis, colitis asthma, obesity, and COVID-19.

Clinical trials
Monoclonal antibodies against GM-CSF are being used as treatment in clinical trials against rheumatoid arthritis, ankylosing spondylitis, and COVID-19.

See also 
 CFU-GM
 Filgrastim (Neupogen,  a granulocyte colony-stimulating factor (G-CSF) analog)
 Granulocyte-macrophage colony-stimulating factor receptor
 Lenzilumab
 Pegfilgrastim (Neulasta, a PEGylated form  filgrastim)

References

External links 
 Official gentaur web site
 Official Leukine web site
 
 

Cytokines
Drugs acting on the blood and blood forming organs
Growth factors